Thomas Jefferson High School is a public high school located in Council Bluffs, Iowa. It is one of two high schools in the Council Bluffs Community School District.

The school was opened in 1922 to service students on the west end of Council Bluffs.

In 1986, students from the ninth grade were moved from the junior high school system to the high school system. Prior to this, the high school taught only the 10th, 11th and 12th grades.

Sports

The school competes in the Missouri River Conference in the following sports:

 Baseball
 Basketball
 Bowling
 Cross country
 Football
 Golf
 Soccer
 Softball
 Swimming
 Tennis
 Track
 Volleyball
 Wrestling

Successes
The Yellow Jackets have won the State Championship in baseball 9 times (1953, 1957, 1959, 1960, 1962 (spring and summer), 1966, 1973, 1993) and the 2019 Class 2A State Championship in Bowling.

Clubs and Societies

The school sponsors the following clubs and societies:

 ASTRA
 Anime Club
 Band
 Cheerleading
 Dance
 DECA
 Drama
 National Honor Society
 Newspaper
 Robotics
 Speech
 Yearbook

Chanticleer Theater
In 1953, the Chanticleer Theater staged its first production. The Man Who Came to Dinner was performed in the Thomas Jefferson auditorium. The theater company continued to use the auditorium until 1958.

Notable alumni
 Farrah Abraham, television personality and adult film star
 Walter Cassel, performer in the Metropolitan Opera
 Chris Hatcher, former professional baseball player
 Carl W. Hoffman, U.S. Marine Corps Major General
 Tom Knudson, class of 1971, American journalist and a two-time Pulitzer Prize winner in 1985 and 1992.
 Terry Lawless, studio and touring musician
 Brian Poldberg, professional baseball player and coach,
 William Smith, Olympic Gold Medalist in Wrestling
 Marjabelle Young Stewart, etiquette expert

See also
List of high schools in Iowa

References

External links
Council Bluffs Community School District – Official site.
Thomas Jefferson High School - Official site.

Public high schools in Iowa
Buildings and structures in Council Bluffs, Iowa
Schools in Pottawattamie County, Iowa
Educational institutions established in 1922
1922 establishments in Iowa